Burmaculex antiquus is an extinct species of mosquito found fossilised in Burmese amber dating from the Cretaceous period, believed to date from 95 million years ago. The genus and species were described in 2004 by Art Borkent and David A. Grimaldi.

References

Culicidae
Cretaceous insects
Insects described in 2004